Melrose Avenue is a shopping, dining and entertainment destination in Los Angeles that starts at Santa Monica Boulevard, at the border between Beverly Hills and West Hollywood. It ends at Lucile Avenue in Silver Lake. Melrose runs north of Beverly Boulevard and south of Santa Monica Boulevard.

Paved in 1909, Melrose Avenue's namesake comes from the Massachusetts town of the same name.

Its most famous section, known as the Melrose District, is the West End through West Hollywood and Hollywood.

At the corner of Fairfax and Melrose is Fairfax High School, which marks the start of the Fairfax District.

One of the most famous landmarks located on Melrose Avenue is Paramount Pictures.

Metro Local line 10 operates on Melrose Avenue.

History
A petition signed by voters in the Melrose addition was presented to the city council of Los Angeles in February 1922 requesting annexation to the city. The Melrose Annexation was effective June 16, 1922. The area was 0.67 square miles, generally along Melrose Avenue, from Sweetzer Avenue on the west to June Street on the east.

Melrose District

The eastern end of the district, which runs from Fairfax to Highland Avenue, became a popular underground and new wave shopping area in the early 1980s and a centerpoint for the new wave and punk subcultures. The avenue has appeared in various films and television shows, including Entourage, LA Ink, Melrose Place and the "Jaywalking" segments of The Tonight Show with Jay Leno.

Many stores and businesses have made their homes in the district, including Retail Slut and a large outdoor flea market called the Melrose Trading Post. At the corner of Highland and Melrose is what has been described by the Los Angeles Times as the "boss of LA's Italian dining scene", Osteria Mozza, which marks the eastern end of the Fairfax District. Much of the area is managed by the Melrose Avenue Business Improvement District.

Melrose Heights
The Western End, popularly referred to as Melrose Heights, runs from La Cienega Blvd. to Fairfax Avenue and features a variety of upscale restaurants, salons such as Elixir (teahouse), The Bodhi Tree Bookstore (metaphysical and New Age books), Fred Segal, Plush Home, and The Improv. Melrose Heights is also home to several high-end designer stores, such as Marc Jacobs, Diane von Fürstenberg, Carolina Herrera, Mulberry, Sergio Rossi, Alexander McQueen, Oscar de la Renta, BCBG Max Azria, Paul Smith, Temperley London, John Varvatos, Balenciaga, Diesel, Vivienne Westwood, Homa Bridal and Vera Wang.

Melrose Place
North of the intersection with La Cienega Boulevard is Melrose Place, a branch of the main avenue made famous thanks to the soap opera of the same name. In reality, Melrose Place features no residences and has historically been home to antique shops, boutiques and salons.

La Cienega Design Quarter
The area of Melrose Avenue that intersects La Cienega Boulevard and its satellite streets is part of the La Cienega Design Quarter. Its shops and galleries house many antiques, furniture, rugs, accessories and art.

References

Sources

Melrose Avenue Official Guide
Huffington Post - October 8 2010

External links

Streets in Los Angeles
Streets in Los Angeles County, California
Shopping districts and streets in Greater Los Angeles
Economy of Los Angeles
Landmarks in Los Angeles
Streets in Hollywood, Los Angeles
East Hollywood, Los Angeles
Streets in West Hollywood, California
Westside (Los Angeles County)